Warren Widener (1938–2013) was a former Mayor of Berkeley, California, and former member of the Alameda County Board of Supervisors. He was the first African American mayor of Berkeley, serving two terms from 1971 to 1979. Before entering politics Widener worked as an attorney and was President of the Urban Housing Institute.

Widener was born in 1938 in Oroville, California.  He died on June 25, 2013 in Hayward, California, aged 75.  He served as a captain in the U.S. Air Force, then earned his law degree at Boalt Hall at UC Berkeley.  He subsequently served as president of the Urban Housing Institute near the UC campus.

Political career
After election in 1969 to a four-year term the Berkeley City Council, Widener, 33, ran for Mayor in 1971 against Vice-Mayor Wilmont Sweeney. (Sweeney was first black member of the nine-member Council, elected in 1961; future Congressman Ron Dellums the second, elected in 1967; and Widener the third.)

"Although he was Berkeley's first black mayor, most black voters backed his opponent. Widener won the election due to a large turnout of the University's student population," according to Ebony Magazine.

At the first meeting of the newly sworn-in 1971 City Council meeting, three members of the council refused to say the Pledge of Allegiance, but Widener and others participated.

Widener had been elected by many progressive voters in 1971, but those same voters perceived him as shifting to the right after his election. In 1973, Widener endorsed the Berkeley Four, a "slate of liberal Democratic types." Student turnout went down 20 from 1971 while there was a 75 per cent turnout in the Berkeley Hills, the wealthier side of the city.

In 1975, Berkeley Citizens' Action, a coalition of progressives, radicals and reformers, nominated Ying Lee Kelley to run against Widener. Relying upon support of the liberal Berkeley Democratic Club, Widener defeated Kelley and Carl Finamore of the Socialist Workers Party.

In 1979, the BCA's nominee Gus Newport defeated Widener.

In 1988, Widener ran successfully for the District 5 seat on the Alameda County Board of Supervisors, succeeding John George.

In 1992, Widener was defeated for re-election by Keith Carson.

Other activities
Widener was a past-president of the Berkeley Repertory Theater.

References 

Mayors of Berkeley, California
California lawyers
California city council members
1938 births
2013 deaths
UC Berkeley School of Law alumni
Lawyers from Berkeley, California
Politicians from Oroville, California
20th-century American lawyers
African-American mayors in California
20th-century African-American people
21st-century African-American people